Blackstone Historic District is a national historic district located at Blackstone, Nottoway County, Virginia. 
It encompasses 272 contributing buildings and 1 contributing structure in the town of Blackstone.  They include residential and commercial structures dating from the late-18th to early-20th centuries.  They include notable examples of the Late Gothic Revival, Queen Anne, and Romanesque styles. Notable buildings include the former Blackstone College for Girls (1922), First National Bank, Thomas M. Dillard House, Richmond F. Dillard House, Blackstone Public School Complex, Bagley House (1911), James D. Crawley House (1903), Blackstone Baptist Church (1907), Crenshaw United Methodist Church (1903), St. Luke's Episcopal Church (1916), and Blackstone Presbyterian Church (1901). The James D. Crawley House was designed by J. E. McDaniel, who was a local architect. Located in the district is the separately listed Schwartz Tavern.

It was listed on the National Register of Historic Places in 1991.

Gallery

References

Historic districts on the National Register of Historic Places in Virginia
Buildings and structures in Nottoway County, Virginia
National Register of Historic Places in Nottoway County, Virginia